Tirzepatide, sold under the brand name Mounjaro, is an antidiabetic medication used for the treatment of type 2 diabetes. Tirzepatide is administered once weekly through subcutaneous injection (under the skin).

The most common side effects include nausea, vomiting, diarrhea, decreased appetite, constipation, upper abdominal discomfort, and abdominal pain.

Glucagon-like peptide-1 (GLP-1) and glucose-dependent insulinotropic polypeptide (GIP) are hormones involved in blood sugar control. After a person has eaten, these hormones are secreted by cells of the intestines and in turn cause the secretion of insulin. Tirzepatide is a GIP-analogue that activates both the GLP-1 and GIP receptors, leading to improved blood sugar control. 

Tirzepatide was approved for medical use in the United States in May 2022, in the  European Union in September 2022, in Canada in November 2022, and in Australia in December 2022. The US Food and Drug Administration (FDA) considers it to be a first-in-class medication.

Medical uses 
Tirzepatide is indicated to improve blood sugar control in adults with type 2 diabetes, as an addition to diet and exercise.

Contraindications 
Tirzepatide should not be used in people with a personal or family history of medullary thyroid cancer or in people with multiple endocrine neoplasia syndrome type 2.

Adverse effects 
Preclinical, phase I, and phase II clinical trials indicated that tirzepatide exhibits adverse effects similar to those of other established GLP-1 receptor agonists, such as dulaglutide. These effects occur largely within the gastrointestinal tract. The most frequently observed are nausea, diarrhea and vomiting, which increased in incidence with the dosage amount (i.e. higher likelihood the higher the dose). The number of patients who discontinued taking tirzepatide also increased as dosage increased, with patients taking 15 mg having a 25% discontinuation rate vs 5.1% for 5 mg patients and 11.1% for dulaglutide. To a slightly lesser extent, patients also reported reduced appetite. Other side effects reported were dyspepsia, constipation, abdominal pain, dizziness and hypoglycaemia.

Pharmacology 
Tirzepatide is an analogue of gastric inhibitory polypeptide (GIP), a human hormone that stimulates the release of insulin from the pancreas. Tirzepatide is a linear polypeptide of 39 amino acids that has been chemically modified by lipidation to improve its uptake into cells and its stability to metabolism. It completed phase III trials globally in 2021.

Mechanism of action 
Tirzepatide has a greater affinity to GIP receptors than to GLP-1 receptors, and this dual agonist behavior has been shown to produce greater reductions of hyperglycemia compared to a selective GLP-1 receptor agonist. Signaling studies reported that tirzepatide mimics the actions of natural GIP at the GIP receptor. However, at the GLP-1 receptor, tirzepatide shows bias towards cAMP (a messenger associated with regulation of glycogen, sugar and lipid metabolism) generation, rather than β-arrestin recruitment. This combination of preference towards GIP receptor and distinct signaling properties at GLP-1 suggest this biased agonism increases insulin secretion. Tirzepatide has been reported to increase levels of adiponectin, an adipokine involved in the regulation of both glucose and lipid metabolism, with a maximum increase of 26% from baseline after 26 weeks, at the 10 mg dosage.

Chemistry

Structure 
Tirzepatide is an analog of the human GIP hormone with a C20 fatty-diacid portion attached, used to optimise the uptake and metabolism of the compound. The fatty-diacid section (eicosanedioic acid) is linked via a glutamic acid and two (2-(2-aminoethoxy)ethoxy)acetic acid units to the side chain of the lysine residue. This arrangement allows for a much longer half life, extending the time between doses, because of its high affinity to albumin.

Synthesis 
The synthesis of tirzepatide was first disclosed in patents filed by Eli Lilly and Company. This uses standard solid phase peptide synthesis, with an allyloxycarbonyl protecting group on the lysine at position 20 of the linear chain of amino acids, allowing a final set of chemical transformations in which the sidechain amine of that lysine is derivatized with the lipid-containing fragment.

Large-scale manufacturing processes have been reported for this compound.

History 
Eli Lilly and Company first applied for a patent for a method of glycemic control using tirzepatide in early 2016. The patent was published late that year. After passing phase III clinical trials, Lilly applied for FDA approval in October 2021, with a priority review voucher.

Following the completion of the SURPASS-2 trial (NCT03987919), the company announced on 28 April 2022 that tirzepatide had successfully met their endpoints in obese and overweight patients without diabetes.

In industry-funded preliminary trials comparing tirzepatide to the existing diabetes medication semaglutide (an injected analogue of the hormone GLP-1), tirzepatide showed minor improvement of reductions (2.01%–2.30% depending on dosage) in glycated hemoglobin tests relative to semaglutide (1.86%). A 10 mg dose has also been shown to be effective in reducing insulin resistance, with a reduction of around 8% from baseline, measured using HOMA2-IR (computed with fasting insulin). Fasting levels of IGF binding proteins like IGFBP1 and IGFBP2 increased following tirzepatide treatment, increasing insulin sensitivity.

Meta-analysis 

A 2021 meta-analysis showed that over one-year of clinical use, tirzepatide was observed to be superior to dulaglutide, semaglutide, degludec, and insulin glargine with regards to glycemic efficacy and obesity reduction.

In a phase III double-blind, randomized, controlled trial supported by Eli Lilly, non-diabetic adults with a body mass index of 30 or more, or 27 or more and at least one weight-related complication, excluding diabetes, were randomized to receive once-weekly, subcutaneous tirzepatide (5 mg, 10 mg, or 15 mg), or placebo. The mean percentage change in weight at week 72 was −15.0% (95% confidence interval [CI], −15.9 to −14.2) with 5-mg weekly doses of tirzepatide, −19.5% (95% CI, −20.4 to −18.5) with 10-mg doses, and −20.9% (95% CI, −21.8 to −19.9) with 15-mg doses. Weight change in the placebo group was −3.1% (95% CI, −4.3 to −1.9).

Society and culture

Legal status 
The US Food and Drug Administration (FDA) granted the application for tirzepatide priority review designation. The FDA granted the approval of Mounjaro to Eli Lilly and Company

On 21 July 2022, the Committee for Medicinal Products for Human Use (CHMP) of the European Medicines Agency (EMA) adopted a positive opinion, recommending the granting of a marketing authorization for the medicinal product Mounjaro, intended for the treatment of type 2 diabetes. Tirzepatide was approved for medical use in the European Union in September 2022.

Names 
Tirzepatide is the international nonproprietary name (INN).

References

Further reading

External links 
 
 
 
 
 
 

Eli Lilly and Company brands
Glucagon-like peptide-1 receptor agonists
Hormones of the digestive system
Neuropeptides
Peptide hormones